St. Peter's Parish Church may refer to:

St. Peter's Parish Church, Edlington, South Yorkshire, England
St. Peter's Parish Church, Onchan, Isle of Man

See also
St. Peter's Church (disambiguation)